The FIS Snowboarding World Championships 2013 were held between January 18 and January 27, 2013 at Stoneham Mountain Resort in Stoneham-et-Tewkesbury, Quebec.

Results

Men's events

Women's events

Medal table

References

External links

FIS website

2013
Qualification events for the 2014 Winter Olympics
World Championships
2013 in Canadian sports